Violadores del Verso, also known as Doble V, are a rap music crew from Zaragoza, Spain. They used the name Doble V but were forced to return to their original long name due to legal issues (Doble V is also the trademark of a Spanish whiskey). The band members are MCs Kase.O, Lírico, Sho-Hai (also known as Hate) and DJ R de Rumba.

Violadores del Verso won the gold record for Vivir para contarlo (2006), and together with SFDK they are the only Spanish rap groups to have won a gold record to date. Violadores del Verso are often considered the greatest Spanish hip hop group in history and one of the most influential Spanish-speaking hip hop artists of all time.

The group has been on a long pause since 2010 as they wanted to grow separate careers and be creators on their own.

Biography 
Violadores del Verso started off in 1997 in Zaragoza, Spain. They were initially 5 MC's, but Brutal (Kase.O's brother) left the group.

In 1999 they published their first LP as a group, Genios, which increased their popularity on the Spanish rap scene. They had legal problems with a whiskey company called Doble V, so they changed the name of the group back to their original name Violadores del Verso.

In 2001 they published two more albums as Doble V. In 2006 they published "Vivir para contarlo", which is regarded as one of the best Spanish hip hop albums of all time.

In 2019, the member Lírico was arrested for the aggression of a 27 year-old woman who he said was stalking him.

Discography 
 Violadores del verso Bufank (1997)
 Violadores del verso (EP) (Avoid, 1998)
 Violadores del Verso presentan a Kase-O en: Mierda (Maxi) (Avoid records, 1998)
 Genios (LP) (Avoid, 1999)
 Atrás (Maxi) (Rap Solo, 2001)
 Violadores del Verso + Kase-O Mierda (Reedición, (Boa Music, 2001)
 Vicios y Virtudes (LP) (Rap Solo/Boa Music, 2001)
 Tú eres alguien/Bombo clap (DVD en directo) (Rap Solo/Boa Music, 2002)
 Vivir para contarlo / Haciendo lo nuestro (Maxi) (Rap Solo/Boa Music, 2006) 
 Gira 06/07 Presente (LP/DVD) (Rap Solo/Boa Music, 12/12/2007)

Trivia
In some live shows, Sho-Hai sang some themes on Michael Jackson Billie Jean's base, he cites Jackson as his favourite artist.
They have acted with Soziedad Alkoholika, a very successful metal and hardcore punk band from Spain.
The first 3D TVE (Spanish Television) emission was a concert of Violadores del Verso (August 2011)
Vivir para Contarlo won a golden disc just one week later of its release.
In the book El francotirador paciente, of Arturo Pérez Reverte, one of the characters listened to SFDK and Violadores del Verso
Hate acquire his aka "Sho-Hai" from the movie Drunken Master.

See also
Spanish hip hop
SFDK

References

External links 
  (in Spanish)

Aragon
Spanish hip hop groups
Musical groups established in 1998
MTV Europe Music Award winners